The 2021 Weber State Wildcats football team represented Weber State University in the 2021 NCAA Division I FCS football season. The Wildcats were led by eighth-year head coach Jay Hill and played their games at Stewart Stadium as members of the Big Sky Conference.

Previous season

They finished the 2020–21 season 5–1, 5–0 in Big Sky play to finish for the Big Sky championship. They received the Big Sky's automatic bid to the FCS Playoffs where they lost in the first round to Southern Illinois.

Preseason

Polls
On July 26, 2021, during the virtual Big Sky Kickoff, the Wildcats were predicted to finish first in the Big Sky by both the coaches and media.

Schedule

Game summaries

at No. 24 (FBS) Utah

at Dixie State

No. 3 James Madison

No. 12 UC Davis

at Cal Poly

No. 9 Montana State

at No. 2 Eastern Washington

at Idaho State

Portland State

at Southern Utah

at Northern Colorado

References

Weber State
Weber State Wildcats football seasons
Weber State Wildcats football